Edgerton may refer to:

Places
In Canada:
Edgerton, Alberta

In the United Kingdom:
Edgerton, Huddersfield, West Yorkshire

In the United States:
Edgerton, Indiana
Edgerton, Kansas
Edgerton, Minnesota
Edgerton, Missouri
Edgerton, Ohio
Edgerton, Wisconsin
Edgerton, Wyoming

People with the surname
Alfred Peck Edgerton (1813–1897), American land developer and politician
Alonzo J. Edgerton (1827–1896), American politician
Benjamin Hyde Edgerton (1811–1886), American surveyor and politician
Clyde Edgerton (born 1944), American author
David Edgerton (1927–2018), founder of Burger King
David Edgerton (born 1959), British historian of science
Elisha W. Edgerton (1815–1904), businessman and politician
Franklin Edgerton (1885–1963), American linguist
Glen Edgar Edgerton (1887–1976), former governor of the Panama Canal Zone
Henry White Edgerton (1888–1970), United States federal judge
Harold Eugene Edgerton (1903–1990), professor of electrical engineering at MIT and noted photographer
H. K. Edgerton (born 1948), black heritage activist in North Carolina
James Clark Edgerton (1896–1973), U.S. Army aviator and Air Mail pilot 
Joel Edgerton (born 1974), Australian actor
Nash Edgerton (born 1973), Australian actor and film director

Fictional
Ian Edgerton, FBI agent in the TV series Numb3rs.

See also 
 Edgerton, former mansion in Edgerton Park, New Haven, Connecticut
 Egerton (disambiguation)

English-language surnames
Surnames of English origin